Charlton is a locality in the eastern Southland region of New Zealand's South Island.

The population was 687 in the 2013 census. This was an increase of 99 people since the 2006 Census.

References 

Populated places in Southland, New Zealand